Euphorbia robivelonae is a species of plant in the family Euphorbiaceae. It is endemic to Madagascar.  Its natural habitat is intermittent rivers. It is threatened by habitat loss.

References

Endemic flora of Madagascar
robivelonae
Critically endangered plants
Taxonomy articles created by Polbot